Hargrave is an unincorporated settlement in southwestern Manitoba, Canada. It is situated on the Trans-Canada Highway approximately 12 kilometers (8 miles) northwest of Virden, Manitoba in the Rural Municipality of Wallace.

References 

Unincorporated communities in Westman Region